Orny may refer to:

 Orny, Vaud, Switzerland
 Orny, Moselle, a commune of the Moselle département, in France
 Orny Adams (b. 1970), American comedian